Vikram Malhotra (born 16 November 1989 in Mumbai) is an Indian professional squash player. As of February 2018, he was ranked number 68 in the world.

References

1989 births
Living people
Indian male squash players
Trinity Bantams men's squash players
Squash players at the 2018 Commonwealth Games
Commonwealth Games competitors for India